James Kwame Twum was Ghanaian journalist and politician. He served as the member of parliament for the Amenfi-Aowin constituency from 1962 to 1965 and the member of parliament for the Asankragua constituency from 1965 to 1966.

See also
 List of MPs elected in the 1965 Ghanaian parliamentary election

References

Ghanaian MPs 1965–1966
Convention People's Party (Ghana) politicians
20th-century Ghanaian politicians
Ghanaian journalists